Claudine Schneider (née Cmarada; born March 25, 1947) is an American economist and former politician who served as a Republican U.S. representative from Rhode Island. She was the first, and to date only, woman elected to Congress from Rhode Island. She is the founder of Republicans for Integrity, which describes itself as a network of "Republican former Members of Congress who feel compelled to remind Republican voters about the fundamentals of [the Republican] party and to provide the facts about incumbents' voting records."

Life and career

Schneider was born Claudine Cmarada in Clairton, Pennsylvania. On her father's side, she is of Slovak descent.  Schneider attended parochial schools. She studied at the University of Barcelona, Spain, and Rosemont College (Pennsylvania).
She obtained a B.A. degree from Windham College (Vermont) in 1969. She also attended the University of Rhode Island Program in Community Planning.

She was the founder of the Rhode Island Committee on Energy in 1973, and was appointed executive director of the Conservation Law Foundation in 1974. She became Federal coordinator of Rhode Island Coastal Zone Management Program in 1978. She worked as a producer and host of a public affairs television program in Providence from 1978 to 1979.

Schneider was elected as a Republican to the 97th Congress and was re-elected to the four succeeding Congresses, serving from January 3, 1981, to January 3, 1991 for Rhode Island's 2nd congressional district.

She did not stand for re-election in 1990 to the 102nd Congress but was an unsuccessful nominee for the United States Senate in challenging incumbent Claiborne Pell.

In 1985, she was interviewed by David Wallechinsky for his book, "Midterm Report: The Class of '65: Chronicles Of An American Generation" (1986). It was later published as "Class Reunion '65, Tales of an American Generation," written from the perspective of two decades post-high school graduation. Twenty-eight contemporary graduates were interviewed, Wallachinsky noting the profound impact of the Vietnam War on their lives.

After leaving Congress, she served as a member of the faculty of the John F. Kennedy School of Government of Harvard University.

She is a resident of Boulder, Colorado, where she works as an independent consultant, specializing in environmental matters and ecological economics.

In June 2022, Schneider was one of eleven former Republican House representatives to sign a letter to Congress urging lawmakers to pass an LGBTQ nondiscrimination bill.

See also
Women in the United States House of Representatives

References

Sources

|-

|-

1947 births
American environmentalists
American women environmentalists
American people of Slovak descent
Ecological economists
Female members of the United States House of Representatives
Harvard Kennedy School faculty
Living people
Politicians from Boulder, Colorado
People from Clairton, Pennsylvania
Republican Party members of the United States House of Representatives from Rhode Island
Rosemont College alumni
University of Barcelona alumni
University of Rhode Island alumni
Women in Rhode Island politics
Women state legislators in Rhode Island
21st-century American women